Alstadhaug Church is a parish church of the Church of Norway in the village of Alstadhaug, in Levanger municipality in Trøndelag county. It is the church for the Alstadhaug parish, which is part of the Stiklestad prosti (deanery) in the Diocese of Nidaros. The church was built in a long church style during the 12th century by an unknown architect. The church seats about 238 people.

History
  
The earliest existing historical records of the church date back to the year 1280, but the church was likely built during the mid- to late 1100s. It features elements from both Romanesque and Gothic architecture. The church building is built of stone with wood ceilings. Dendrochronology surveys of the roof show the timber dates to the years 1166–67. It is therefore likely that the church was completed around the year 1170. Construction on the church likely began 20 to 30 years before its completion (around 1130–1140).

It  has not been excavated but estimates have dated it from the Iron Age (5th to 8th centuries AD).

The church originally had a large tower on the west end, but in the early 1200s the tower was dismantled and its stone was used to build an octagonal apse to enlarge the choir and two retaining walls along the southwest corner of the nave. A sacristy in stone was built on the north side of the choir in the early 15th century. Over the centuries the building has been remodeled several times and the floor plan has undergone several changes. The interior features the remains of murals from the 13th century with famous Biblical motifs. The altarpiece dating from the 1650s was carved by Trøndelag-based artist and craftsman Johan Johansen (d. 1657) who was called a woodcarver and painted by Johan Hanssønn listed as portrait artist. Around the year 1700, a new porch was built on the southwest entrance to the church. In 1788, a new tower and spire was built on top of the nave's roof.

In 1814, this church served as an election church. Together with more than 300 other parish churches across Norway, it was a polling station for elections to the 1814 Norwegian Constituent Assembly which wrote the Constitution of Norway. This was Norway's first national elections. Each church parish was a constituency that elected people called "electors" who later met together in each county to elect the representatives for the assembly that was to meet in Eidsvoll later that year.

Media gallery

See also

List of churches in Nidaros

References

Levanger
Churches in Trøndelag
Long churches in Norway
Stone churches in Norway
12th-century churches in Norway
12th-century establishments in Norway
Norwegian election church